Lorne Henning (born February 22, 1952) is a Canadian professional ice hockey executive and former player. He most recently served as Director of Player Personnel and Assistant General Manager for the NHL's Vancouver Canucks.

Born  in Melfort, Saskatchewan, Henning spent nine years as a forward with the New York Islanders, with whom he earned an assist on the May 24, 1980 goal by Bobby Nystrom that earned the Islanders their first of four consecutive Stanley Cups.

In the summer of 1980 he became an assistant coach with New York Islanders. He also played nine regular season games, and one playoff game, becoming the last player-coach for a Stanley Cup-winning team. He was credited with an assist on Bobby Nystrom’s overtime goal that won the Islanders their first Stanley Cup. Henning retired for good as a player after the 1981 season but retained his assistant coaching position.  He left Long Island a few years later to become the head coach of the Minnesota North Stars in 1985–86. Henning was replaced during the 1986–87 season with Glen Sonmor. He later returned to New York Islanders as an assistant coach. In 1994–95 Henning replaced the retiring Al Arbour as coach.  He was fired in the offseason and replaced by Mike Milbury. He later served as an assistant coach with Chicago Blackhawks, Mighty Ducks of Anaheim, and the Islanders. He was the Assistant General Manager for the Vancouver Canucks until 2015.

Career statistics

Regular season and playoffs

Coaching record

Awards
Stanley Cup Champion 1980 (player), 1981 (player/Ass't Coach), 1982, 1983 (Ass't Coach)

External links
 
Picture of Lorne Henning's Name on the 1980 Stanley Cup Plaque
Picture of Lorne Henning's Name on the 1982 Stanley Cup Plaque

1952 births
Living people
Anaheim Ducks coaches
Canadian ice hockey centres
Canadian ice hockey coaches
Chicago Blackhawks coaches
Estevan Bruins players
Fort Worth Wings players
Minnesota North Stars coaches
New Haven Nighthawks players
New Westminster Bruins players
New York Islanders coaches
New York Islanders draft picks
New York Islanders players
People from Melfort, Saskatchewan
Stanley Cup champions
Vancouver Canucks executives